Yele may refer to:

 Yele, Shwegu -Kachin State, Burma
 Yele, Bo District, in Bo District, Sierra Leone
 Yele, Tonkolili District, in Tonkolili District, Sierra Leone
 Yéle Haiti Foundation
 Yele language
 "Yele", a song by Wyclef Jean from the 1997 album Wyclef Jean Presents The Carnival